The 2011 Finlandia Trophy was an international figure skating competition in the 2011–12 season. It was the 16th edition of the annual event and held on October 6–9, 2011 at the Valtti Areena in Vantaa. Skaters competed in the disciplines of men's singles, ladies' singles, and ice dancing on the senior level.

Competitors

Results

Men

Ladies

Ice dancing

 WD = Withdrew

References

External links
 2011 Finlandia Trophy results
 Finlandia Trophy at the Finnish Figure Skating Association

2011
Finlandia Trophy
Finlandia Trophy